Alexandra Georgiana Eremia (born 19 February 1987) is a Romanian former artistic gymnast. Her best apparatus was the balance beam on which she had an interesting routine starting with her trademark split mount. She is an Olympic and a European gold medalist  with the team. Individually, she won several medals on beam in various international competitions. She is the 2004 Olympic bronze medalist and the 2004 European silver medalist on this event.

Early life and career
Eremia was a successful junior gymnast before establishing herself as a strong senior. Eremia was the 2001 Romanian all around silver medalist and was a member of the Romanian team at the 2002 Junior Europeans held in Patras, Greece. Here she placed fourth on beam and won silver with the team.

Senior career

2003
In 2003, Eremia was age eligible to compete as a senior and was a member of the Romanian team that competed at the 2003 World Championships in Anaheim, California. Here she contributed to the team silver medal by competing on beam and on uneven bars.

2004 and Athens Olympics
In 2004, she was a member of the Romanian at the European Championships. Eremia won gold with team and an individual silver on beam (9.575). However, it was the 2004 Olympics where Eremia established herself as a star. She was part of an immensely successful Romanian women's gymnastics team (four golds, one silver and one bronze in six events) that also included Oana Ban, Monica Roșu, Silvia Stroescu, Daniela Sofronie and Cătălina Ponor. In the team finals Eremia competed on the balance beam only, where she posted the second highest score of the night. Individually, she won the bronze medal on beam.

Post Olympic Games
After Athens, she continued her success by competing in World Cup events across Europe as well as winning more fans with her spunky personality which she is known for. She won silver on floor and gold on balance beam at the 2004 DTB Cup in Stuttgart. In December 2004, she won bronze on beam in the World Cup finals in Birmingham.
However, in 2005 Eremia did not make it onto the Romanian team to compete at the 2005 World Championships as she struggled with fitness after a year which saw her caught up in controversies such as being caught sneaking from training camps to go nightclubbing.

Post retirement
Eremia retired in early 2006 as she had little chance of making the Romanian team for the 2006 Europeans. After graduating her University studies she went back to her former club (Steaua Bucharest) where she works as an artistic gymnastic coach for young girls.

References

External links

1987 births
Living people
Romanian female artistic gymnasts
Olympic gold medalists for Romania
Olympic bronze medalists for Romania
Olympic gymnasts of Romania
Olympic medalists in gymnastics
Gymnasts at the 2004 Summer Olympics
Medalists at the 2004 Summer Olympics
Medalists at the World Artistic Gymnastics Championships
Romanian gymnastics coaches
Gymnasts from Bucharest
European champions in gymnastics
21st-century Romanian women